Mehmet Parsak (born 3 March 1979) is a Turkish politician from the Nationalist Movement Party (MHP), who has served as a Member of Parliament for Afyonkarahisar since 7 June 2015.

Early life and career
Mehmet Parsak was born on 3 March 1979 in Afyonkarahisar and graduated from high school there in 1998. He graduated from Selçuk University Faculty of Law. He became a lawyer in Ankara in 2002 and worked in the Turkish Law Institute in 2004. He completed his master's degree at Gazi University and became the President of the Afyonkarahisar and Districts Solidarity Association in 2009.

Political career
Parsak had been involved in the Grey Wolves, the youth wing of the Nationalist Movement Party (MHP), during his student years. He also attended the first term of the MHP Politics and Leadership School in 2009. He formed the MHP legal action group in 2011. In 2012, he was elected to the MHP Central Executive Committee and was re-elected in the 11th Nationalist Movement Party Ordinary Congress in 2015. He was elected as a Member of Parliament for Afyonkarahisar in the June 2015 general election.

See also
25th Parliament of Turkey

References

External links
 MP profile on the Grand National Assembly website
 Collection of all relevant news items at Haberler.com

Nationalist Movement Party politicians
Deputies of Afyonkarahisar
Members of the 25th Parliament of Turkey
Living people
1979 births
People from Afyonkarahisar
Members of the 26th Parliament of Turkey